Yu Oh-seong (born September 11, 1966)  is a South Korean actor. He is best known for his roles in The Spy (1999), Attack the Gas Station (1999) and Friend (2001).

Career
Yu Oh-seong made his stage debut in 1992, and throughout the mid-1990s, he complemented a career in television with minor roles in film. With his success playing a young gangster in the hit movie Beat (1997), Yu's face became familiar to a new generation of moviegoers. The year 1999 was somewhat of a breakthrough for Yu, as he took the lead role in Jang Jin's acclaimed cult comedy, The Spy and also starred in Kim Sang-jin's hugely successful Attack the Gas Station.

His career reached its peak in 2001. Appearing as Jang Dong-gun's co-star in Kwak Kyung-taek's smash hit Friend, which sold an unprecedented 8 million tickets, Yu won effusive critical praise for his hard-edged performance as a ruthless gangster and enjoyed a tremendous degree of exposure.

This fame would carry over somewhat when he took the lead in director Kwak's fourth feature Champion, a 1980s-set biopic of boxer Kim Deuk-gu, who dominated the Korean boxing scene until his death after the World Boxing Association lightweight championship in 1982. However, even though Yu was praised for his body makeover and acting skills, the film failed to deliver on the high expectations that preceded it. Later that year, a series of highly public disagreements with Kwak, believed to stem from money problems, made headlines and served to cool some of the public's interest in the actor.

Yu's next two films, the melodrama Star with actress Park Jin-hee and the patriotic/historical drama Thomas An Jung-geun about the titular independence activist, bombed badly at the box office.

He returned to television in 2004, headlining his first historical drama series (sageuk) Jang Gil-san. Set in the Joseon dynasty during the reign of King Sukjong, Jang Gil-san was born of a female servant, raised by gypsies, then rises politically.

For the contemporary drama Invisible Man in 2006, he played a man in his thirties battling early-onset Alzheimer's disease with the support of his loving family (his wife is played by Chae Shi-ra). Yu said his character Choi Jang-soo was closest to his real-life personality. This was followed by a leading role in adultery drama Dear Lover (2007) with Yoon Son-ha, a remake of 1995 Japanese drama Koibito Yo.

In 2009, Yu and Song Seon-mi played a gangster and doctor who fall in love in the stage play Turn Around and Leave, which was previously dramatized onscreen in the 1998 film  A Promise and the 2006 TV series Lovers. Later that year, he played a supporting role in Potato Symphony, about a man who moves back to his hometown with his daughter, and faces unresolved conflicts with his old high school friends (the protagonist is played by Jeon Yong-taek, who also wrote, directed and produced the film). Jeon and Yu are close friends in real life, and the film is set in their hometown Yeongwol County. Despite winning the Grand Prix at the 4th Festival Franco-Coréen du Film, Potato Symphony was little seen domestically.

After the underwhelming box office and TV ratings of past projects he'd headlined, Yu stuck to supporting roles. He starred opposite Kim Dong-wook in buddy comedy Happy Killers (2010), in which Kim played a slacker cop assigned to investigate a serial killer case, while Yu played an unemployed man with natural instincts as a detective who gets in the way by trying to catch the killer as well. Yu also appeared in action series Swallow the Sun (2009) which was filmed in Las Vegas, South Africa and Jeju Island, two horse-based human comedy films -- Lump Sugar (2006) starring Im Soo-jung and Champ (2011) starring Cha Tae-hyun, and the crime drama Don't Cry Mommy (2012).

More recently, he played villains in the 2010 historical drama Kim Su-ro, The Iron King, and the 2012 fantasy Faith in which he played a fictionalized version of Empress Gi's older brother.

In 2013, Yu reprised his most memorable role in the sequel Friend: The Great Legacy, in which he faces the grown-up son of the friend he'd given orders to be killed (Kim Woo-bin), interspersed with scenes of his own father's gangster past in Busan (Joo Jin-mo).

Yu made a return to the sageuk genre with the 2014 drama series Gunman in Joseon, in which he plays the main antagonist. His performance as Choi Won-sin, a villainous and powerful merchant and the archenemy of Lee Joon-gi's character, was widely praised and earned him a nomination for Best Supporting Actor at the 2014 KBS Drama Awards.

Filmography

Film

Television series

Variety show

Music video

Theater

Awards and nominations

References

External links
 
 
 

20th-century South Korean male actors
21st-century South Korean male actors
South Korean male film actors
South Korean male television actors
South Korean male stage actors
1966 births
Living people
Gangneung Yoo clan